The Compass, Log and Lead is a 2006 studio album of improvised acoustic experimental music by Fred Frith, Carla Kihlstedt and Stevie Wishart. It was recorded in October 2003 in Oakland, California, and released by Intakt Records in 2006.

In the CD liner notes, Frith described the collaboration on this album:
The music on this record is improvised. What we bring to each performance is who we are and all that we have learned so far ... For us, improvising is the sum of our personal musical histories intertwined, a place where we can meet on equal terms and discover things we never knew, or hear what we thought we knew in a new light. It's a conversation, an exchange. There are no rules, other than to listen well and act accordingly.

Reception

In a review at AllMusic, arwulf called The Compass, Log and Lead "an absorbing album of collectively improvised rituals" by Frith and the "exceptionally brilliant" Kihlstedt and Wishart. He lauded it for its "strikingly inspired subtlety, delicacy, and intimacy", and said it is one of the "most intriguing entries in [Frith's] entire discography".

Reviewing the album in the jazz and improvised music online magazine One Final Note, Daniel Spicer said Frith, Kihlstedt and Wishart's performances here are restrained as they test the limits of their acoustic stringed instruments, but he noted that the result is a "bewitching, lo-fi combination of folk and improv". Writing in All About Jazz Glenn Astarita described the trio's "homespun ... avant-garde stylizations" as "an organic gala with a bevy of abstracts and roots-derived melodies". He called the album's twelve pieces "mesmerizing" and said it is "recommended listening".

Track listing
All music by Fred Frith, Carla Kihlstedt and Stevie Wishart.

Sources: AllMusic, Liner notes, Discogs.

Personnel
Fred Frith – acoustic guitar, Lowry organ, violin (track 4)
Carla Kihlstedt – violin, nyckelharpa
Stevie Wishart – hurdy-gurdy, electronics, violin (track 4)

Sources: Liner notes, Discogs.

Sound and artwork
Recorded at New Improved Recording, Oakland, California,  October 2003
Engineering by Myles Boisen and John Finkbeiner
Mastering and final edit at Headless Buddha, Oakland, May 2004 and January 2005
Engineering by Myles Boisen
Production by Intakt Records, Fredi Bosshard and Patrik Landolt
Photography by Francesca Pfeffer
Design by Fabrizio Gilardino
Cover art by Carla Kihlstedt
Liner notes by Fred Frith

Sources: Liner notes, Discogs.

References

External links
The Compass, Log and Lead at Intakt Records
The Compass, Log and Lead reviews at Intakt Records

2006 albums
Collaborative albums
Experimental music albums
Free improvisation albums
Fred Frith albums
Intakt Records albums